MS  Excelsior Neptune (originally, the Feliks Dzerzhinskiy) was an ocean liner owned by the Soviet Union's Black Sea Shipping Company. She was built in 1958 by VEB Mathias-Thesen Werft, Wismar, East Germany, as one of the Mikhail Kalinin series of ships. It was named after Felix Dzerzhinsky, a Soviet statesman and founder of the Soviet secret police (Cheka).

The Feliks Dzerzhinskiy entered regular service with the Black Sea Shipping between Odessa and Alexandria in 1958, and after 1970 she was used by the Far East Shipping between Vladivostok and Kamchatka, and from Nakhodka to Yokohama and Hong Kong. In the late 1970s she was also used by the CTC Line for Pacific Ocean cruises out of Fremantle and Sydney.

In 1988 she was renamed Excelsior Neptune, and was sold to Chinese interests in 1992. It was planned to rebuild her as a cruise ship, along with her sister ship Excelsior Mercury (formerly the Mariya Ulyanova), but she sank in January 1993 while being towed from Hong Kong to Guangzhou.

See also
 List of cruise ships

References

External links

Excelsior Neptune (Феликс Дзержинский → 10.1988) 

Cruise ships
Ships built in East Germany
Passenger ships of the Soviet Union
East Germany–Soviet Union relations
1957 ships
Ships built in Wismar
Ships of Black Sea Shipping Company